Gugul (also Romanized as Gūgūl and Gowgal) is a village in Atrak Rural District, Maneh District, Maneh and Samalqan County, North Khorasan Province, Iran. At the 2006 census, its population was 159, in 30 families.

References 

Populated places in Maneh and Samalqan County